Portea orthopoda is a plant species in the genus Portea.

Cultivars
 × Portemea 'Puna'

References
BSI Cultivar Registry Retrieved 11 October 2009

orthopoda